Lauren Holly (born October 28, 1963) is an American-Canadian actress. She has played the roles of Deputy Sheriff Maxine Stewart in the television series Picket Fences, NCIS Director Jenny Shepard in the series NCIS, Dr. Betty Rogers on Motive, Mary Swanson in Dumb and Dumber, Bruce Lee's wife Linda Lee in Dragon: The Bruce Lee Story, Darian Smalls in Beautiful Girls, and Gigi in What Women Want.

Early life
Holly was born in Bristol, Pennsylvania. Her mother, Michael Ann Holly, is an art historian and the Starr Director of Research and Academic Program at the Sterling and Francine Clark Art Institute, and former professor at Hobart and William Smith Colleges. Her father, Grant Holly, is a screenwriter and professor of literature at Hobart and William Smith Colleges. She has two younger brothers: Nick and Alexander Innes Holly (1977–1992). Holly was raised in Geneva, New York, and is a 1981 graduate of Geneva High School, where she was a cheerleader. In 1985, she earned an undergraduate degree in English from Sarah Lawrence College in New York.

Career

Holly's acting career began at the age of 20 when she appeared as Carla Walicki in two episodes of Hill Street Blues. At age 23, she joined the cast of the ABC television soap opera All My Children as Julie Rand Chandler (1986–1989). She portrayed the comic book character Betty Cooper in the TV movie Archie: To Riverdale and Back Again in 1990.

In 1992, Holly's big break came when she was cast as small-town Deputy Sheriff Maxine Stewart opposite veteran movie actor Tom Skerritt on CBS's Picket Fences for four seasons, appearing in every episode except one. She portrayed Linda Lee Cadwell, the wife of martial artist and actor Bruce Lee, in 1993's Dragon: The Bruce Lee Story. She appeared as Mary Swanson, Lloyd Christmas's love interest, in the 1994 Jim Carrey comedy Dumb and Dumber; a doctor in Sydney Pollack's 1995 remake of Sabrina; and Lieutenant Emily Lake in the 1996 comedy Down Periscope with Kelsey Grammer. She starred in the film Any Given Sunday (1999).

Holly appeared in the music video for Dixie Chicks' single "Goodbye Earl" (2000). She was a member of the cast of NCIS as Director Jenny Shepard from 2005 to 2008, reuniting with her former Chicago Hope co-stars Mark Harmon and Rocky Carroll. Holly portrayed the "worldly and stunning" lead medical examiner Dr. Betty Rogers, a regular character on the CTV series Motive. In 2014, she was reunited with her Picket Fences co-star, Tom Skerritt, in the film Field of Lost Shoes. In 2015, Holly starred in Oz Perkins' horror film The Blackcoat's Daughter.

In 2018, Holly was cast in a recurring role in the third season of Netflix's Designated Survivor as Lynn Harper.

Personal life
Holly has been married three times. Her first marriage was to actor Danny Quinn. The two married in 1991, and divorced two years later in 1993. In 1994, she met Jim Carrey during auditions for Ace Ventura: Pet Detective. She did not get offered the part, but the two developed a relationship while working together during the filming of Dumb and Dumber. In 1996 they were married. The marriage lasted less than a year, and they divorced in 1997. In 2001, she married Francis Greco, a Canadian-born investment banker. The couple adopted three children, sons Henry, George, and Alexander Holly-Greco. In 2008, while married to Greco, she became a Canadian citizen. The couple divorced in 2014.

Holly lives in Oakville, Ontario, Canada, with her three children.

In 1992, Holly, her father Grant, and their families established the "A" Fund at Hobart and William Smith Colleges in memory of her brother, Alexander, about whom Holly said, "He was a boy filled with dreams, hopes, and plans. Although he was only 14 when he died, he had traveled extensively in Europe and Central America, lived in New York City and Los Angeles, and these experiences produced in him a fascination for architecture and archaeology."

Filmography

Film

Television

References

External links

 
 

1963 births
20th-century American actresses
21st-century American actresses
21st-century Canadian actresses
Actresses from Ontario
Actresses from Pennsylvania
American emigrants to Canada
American film actresses
American soap opera actresses
American television actresses
American voice actresses
Canadian film actresses
Canadian soap opera actresses
Canadian television actresses
Canadian voice actresses
Living people
Naturalized citizens of Canada
People from Bristol, Pennsylvania
People from Oakville, Ontario
Sarah Lawrence College alumni